This is a list of Keys to the City awarded in the United States.

Alabama

Huntsville
July 12, 2013: Jase Robertson, star of reality TV series Duck Dynasty
June 28, 2015: Microwave Dave (Gallaher) - North Alabama musician and music educator,

Mobile
July 12, 2016: Jaquiski Tartt, an NFL player for the San Francisco 49ers. Camp for little kids.
September 20, 2017: Nicolas Cage
March 4, 2019: Sandy Howard, King Felix III receives key to the city upon his return from the Isle of Joy.

Alaska

Kodiak
July 30, 2012: Pitbull, rapper

Wasilla
 September 22, 2011: Landon Swank, illusionist

California

Beverly Hills
September 2, 2010: The Kardashian-Jenner family and Larry King were awarded the key to the city of Beverly Hills, the award date falling (by design) on a day designated by the city's famous zip code, 90210.

Coalinga 

 December 6, 2018: Outgoing Mayor of Coalinga Nathan Vosburg was presented the Key to the City of Coalinga by fellow Councilman Adam Adkisson for all his hard work.

Compton
February 13, 2016: Mayor Aja Brown presented Kendrick Lamar with the key to the city.

Corona
March 12, 2010: Scarlett's Magic, a Savannah cat owned by the Draper family (Leon S. Draper, Kimberly Saunders, Martin "Marty" Draper and Matthew "Matteo" Draper) was awarded the key to the city of Corona for being recognized in the 2011 Guinness Book of World Records as the World's Tallest Cat, measuring 45.9 centimeters (18.1 inches) from shoulder to toe.

Cypress
After winning the 1994 U.S Amateur Title, Tiger Woods was presented the key to the city of Cypress, his hometown. The ceremony took place at Cypress Golf Club.
After being selected on the list of 100 most influential people in Orange County, Calif for 2015, 16 year old Dan Ta was presented the key to the city of Cypress, by Mayor Mariellen Yarc at the January 20, 2016 State of the City Luncheon in front of 300 local leaders.

Danville
January 16, 2009: Chesley B. Sullenberger III was awarded the keys to city of his hometown, Danville, for his actions in saving US Airways Flight 1549.

Diamond Bar
On January 24, 2016, US Women's National Soccer Team star Alex Morgan was presented the key to the city of Diamond Bar, her hometown. The ceremony took place at local Pantera Park.

Indio
2008: Mayor Lupe Ramos Watson presented to the Order of the Eastern Star California Worthy Grand Matron the key to the City of Indio for their 100 years of service to the community through volunteerism and unwavering commitment to life, liberty and the pursuit of justice.
2011: Mayor Lupe Ramos Watson presents Honorary Mayor Bob Ladiin for his commitment to the City through Volunteerism, Public Safety and Senior Citizen Advocacy.
2013: Mayor Elaine Holmes presents to Mr Alexander Haagan III the key to the City of Indio city for his long standing support of music the arts, culture and community events at his Empire Polo Grounds in Indio.
2015: Mayor Lupe Ramos Watson presents to the Order of the Eastern Star California Worthy Grand Matron the key to the City of Indio for their 100 plus years of service to the community through volunteerism and unwavering commitment to life, liberty and the pursuit of justice, and for their 70-year commitment to the city's longest standing community festival the Riverside County Fair and National Date Festival.

Lancaster

 On April 30, 2015, Mayor R. Rex Parris presented the key to the city to Matt Anderson, who was named 'Gateway Teacher of the Year."

Long Beach
 February 27, 1983: HM Queen Elizabeth II, Queen of the United Kingdom.

Los Angeles
2006: Twenty-seven Victoria's Secret Angels – including Gisele Bündchen, Adriana Lima, Alessandra Ambrosio, Karolina Kurkova, Selita Ebanks, and Izabel Goulart – were presented with a key to Hollywood by honorary mayor Johnny Grant in honor of the Victoria's Secret Fashion Show being held in Los Angeles for the first time.
August 7, 2009: Zooey Deschanel, Geoffrey Arend, Mark Waters and Jessica Tuchinsky, stars and producers of the 2009 film (500) Days of Summer, were awarded the key to Los Angeles for the film's inventive use of L.A. locations.
2012: Lil' Kim received the key to the city before a performance in front of 50,000 at a LA Pride festival, for being a champion for her LGBT fans. 
May 11, 2013: 5th Caliph of the Ahmadiyya Muslim Community Mirza Masroor Ahmad was awarded the key to the city at prestigious Montage Hotel.
September 23, 2016: Los Angeles Dodgers announcer Vin Scully was awarded the key to the city during a pregame ceremony at Dodger Stadium.
May 2021: West Hollywood mayor, Lindsey P. Horvath, presented a key to the city to Lady Gaga and declared May 23 as "Born This Way Day", part of a celebration of the tenth anniversary of Born This Way and its cultural impact. A street painting with the Daniel Quasar's version of the gay flag (which includes trans and queer people of color) featuring the album's title was also unveiled on Robertson Boulevard as a tribute to the album, and how it has inspired the LGBT community over the years.
October 1, 2022 Los Angeles Dodgers Announcer Jaime Jarrin awarded the Key to the City of Los Angeles in a pregame ceremony at Dodger Stadium on the day they extended their franchise record to 110 wins in a season.

Oakland
1979: Musical group The Jacksons received keys to the city of Oakland.

Sacramento
 1966: Phil Givens, Mayor of Toronto.
 11 September 2015: Spencer Stone, Alek Skarlatos and Anthony Sadler, for actions taken to stop the 2015 Thalys train attack.
 2017: Chance the Rapper received the Key to the City of Sacramento for his charity-based concert held in the city.

San Francisco
1916: Russian-born American businessman, candy-maker and inventor Sam Born was awarded the key to city for inventing a machine that mechanically inserted sticks into lollipops. Later, he went on to found the Just Born candy company in New York.
1941: Hollywood actor Edward Arnold who starred in movies from the 1920s to the 1950s was awarded the key to the city on August 9, 1941, by Mayor Angelo Rossi.  Arnold was the President of the Screen Actors Guild from 1940 to 1942.
1963: Hong Kong music Composer/Violin player 尹自重 (Che Chung Wan, Wan-Chi Chung, Zheng Zhisheng)
October 30, 1965: Italian writer and scholar Uguccione Ranieri di Sorbello was presented the key by mayor John F. Shelley. 
December 12, 1966: Israeli Ambassador to the US Avraham Harman was presented the key by mayor John F. Shelley. 
February 5, 1986: Director for Arts and Culture, Lagos, Mr Gbenga Sonuga (now Oba Gbenga Sonuga, Fadesewa The First of Simawa), Nigeria was presented the key by Mayor Dianne Feinstein on the culture exchange trip to San Francisco in 1986. Taking a visiting local troop to perform the titular play 'Ori' in Oakland and San Francisco, California. 
November 3, 2010: The San Francisco Giants were awarded the key to the city for winning the 2010 World Series.
June 26, 2012: San Francisco Giants pitcher Matt Cain was given the key to the city in commemoration of the perfect game he pitched on June 13, 2012.
September 29, 2012: Myanmar opposition leader Daw Aung San Suu Kyi was given the key to the city at the San Francisco Bay Area, which is home to the third-largest Burmese community in the USA.
October 31, 2012: The San Francisco Giants were awarded the key to city of San Francisco for winning the 2012 World Series.
May 21, 2013: Stephen Curry, basketball player.
November 15, 2013: Batkid is given the key to the city by mayor Ed Lee as part of an event put on by the Make-A-Wish Foundation.
October 31, 2014: The San Francisco Giants were awarded the key to city of San Francisco by Mayor Ed Lee for winning the 2014 World Series.
October 14, 2015: The Golden State Warriors were awarded the key to city of San Francisco by Mayor Ed Lee for winning the 2015 NBA Championship.

Stockton
November 16, 2015: Stockton mayor Anthony Silva gave God the key to the city.

Watts
May 24, 2019: Grammy Award winner and Watts  rapper, Jay Rock  received the key to the city of Watts from the Council member of 15th District, Joe Buscaino.

West Covina
November 17, 2015: The cast and crew of Crazy Ex Girlfriend were awarded with the key to the city of West Covina, the onsite shooting location heavily satirized in the show. A replica of the key was used as a central prop in a season 1 episode and was featured in the protagonist's office afterwards. It currently is on display in the office of series co-creator Aline Brosh McKenna.

Connecticut

Hartford
May 2, 2011: Michael Wilson, artistic director, Hartford Stage Company
August 10, 2013: Christopher Martin, Jamaican Singer/Songwriter
February 15, 2014: John Leguizamo, Comedian and Actor
June 10, 2014: Darko Tresnjak, artistic director, Recipient of the 2014 Tony Award

Middletown

May 29, 2009: Joseph W. Waz, Jr., business executive and native son

New Britain
August 3, 2013: Ryszard Schnepf, Polish Ambassador to the U.S.

Delaware

Wilmington
 3 April 2009: The Fon of Bamunka

District of Columbia

Washington
 1951: General of the Army Douglas MacArthur.
Middle to late 1960s Belinda Yvonne Ferrell received the Key to Washington DC by then Mayor Walter E. Washington (the first mayor of the nation's capitol).
2008: Alexander Ovechkin received the key of the city in honour of being the first player in NHL history to receive the most valuable player, outstanding player, top scorer, and goal scoring leader awards in the same season.
2011: Lamont Peterson, American Boxer
2011: Raheem DeVaughn, American Singer 
2012: Shivon P. Kershaw, youngest community activist recognized in the Nation's Congressional Record for Youth Medal of Honor Award based on Rwanda relief efforts. 
2016: Bryce Harper, Professional Baseball player
2017: Dave Chappelle, Stand-up comedian

Florida

Bradenton
 Phil Givens

Cape Coral
December 13, 2015: Jessica Lynch, Prisoner of War, Private First Class (2001 - 2003), was honored and presented with the key to the city of Cape Coral, Florida by Mayor Marni Sawicki at a private dinner held at the Southwest Florida Military Museum & Library with both special and surprise guests in attendance.  This was a private event closed to both the public and media.

Clearwater
 Phil Givens
 George Hill
 17 January 2012: Frank Crum
 30 October 2013: Robert Engelman, Film Producer for Alcon Entertainment

Doral
September 15, 2013: Henrique Capriles Radonski, Venezuelan opposition leader

Dunedin
July 18, 2013: Lari White, country music artist

Fort Myers
July 11, 2014: Sammy Watkins, American football wide receiver and Fort Myers native.

Key West
 December 20, 1955: Ethel Waters, singer and actress, was presented with the key to the city on the set of Carib Gold, a film in which she starred.
 December 28, 1955: Dwight D. Eisenhower, 34th President of the United States, received the key to the city during a 12-day vacation in Key West.
 May 22, 1956: Estes Kefauver, U.S. Senator, was given the key to the city while campaigning to be nominated the Democratic presidential candidate.
 February 23, 1957: Harry S. Truman, 33rd President of the United States, received the key to the city and was made honorary chairman of the board of county commissioners.
 July 14, 2004: Rosie O'Donnell, comedian and LGBT rights activist, was given the key to the city during the inaugural voyage of her cruise line, R Family Vacations.

Lakeland
 February 11, 1976: John McKay received the key to the city upon his appointment as head coach of the Tampa Bay Buccaneers.

Miami
1981: Musical group The Jacksons received keys to the city of Miami.
2004: The mayors of Miami-Dade County and the city officially welcomed Shaquille O'Neal and presented him with the keys to the city before a press conference was held in the American Airlines Arena.
August 9, 2004: Rap Superstar Lil' Kim was awarded the key to the city of Miami (her place of residence at the time) for her contributions to the world of Hip Hop.
December 6, 2006: Superstar Shakira was awarded the key to the city of Miami for playing 5 shows in AmericanAirlines Arena in one tour, a record she still owns till date.
August 19, 2009: Miami Commissioner Thomas Regalado presented Armando Perez (aka Pitbull) with the key to the city during a morning ceremony.
April 13, 2013: Mayor Matti Bower presented the Key to pop singer Adam Lambert for "being brave enough to be openly gay on American Idol."
July 8, 2013: María Corina Machado, Venezuelan opposition leader
August 20, 2013: José Sulaimán, president of the World Boxing Council
September 15, 2013: Henrique Capriles Radonski, Venezuelan opposition leader
October 29, 2018: Trevor Noah receives key to city and official city proclamation declaring October 29, 2018 Trevor Noah Day.
August 27, 2019: Mayor Francis X. Suarez presented the Key to the City of Miami to Natalie Martinez.
November 15, 2019: Mayor Francis X. Suarez presented the Key to the City of Miami to Jonathan Davis
January 12, 2020: Mayor Francis X. Suarez presented the Key to the City of Miami to Will Smith and Martin Lawrence, and were named honorary police officers of the Miami Police Department
September 28, 2021: Mayor Francis X. Suarez presented the Key to the City of Miami to Conor McGregor.
October 6, 2021: Mayor Francis X. Suarez presented the Key to the City of Miami to Teresa Murphy.
October 6, 2021: Mayor Francis X. Suarez presented the Key to the City of Miami to the 2018 Miami Dade County Francisco R. Walker  Teacher of the Year Rudy Diaz.

North Miami
November 19, 2012: Kim and Kourtney Kardashian, socialites, businesswomen, and models
June 11, 2013: Gregory Toussaint, Pastor

Ocala
 2 March 2007: John Travolta, American Actor
 2 March 2007: Kelly Preston, American Actress
2017: A Day to Remember
25 September 2020: Juanita Perry Cunningham, City resident,  educator and civic activist

Orlando
8 January 2018: 2017 UCF Knights football team
1998 Backstreet boys

Pensacola
 15 November 2016: Addison Russell, Professional Baseball Player for the World Series Champion Chicago Cubs.

Sarasota
April 25, 2013: Paul Thorpe, Sarasota citizen and founding memember of the Downtown Association of Sarasota
September 11, 2013: Diana Ross, singer and actress

St. Petersburg
 1972: Phil Givens

Tallahassee
November 14, 2018: Joshua Quick, awarded key to the city by Mayor Gillum for confronting and attempting to stop a shooter at a yoga studio.

January 9, 2023: DJ DEMP, awarded the key to the city by Mayor John E. Dailey for Outstanding Service to the City of Tallahassee.

Tampa
 January 28, 2003: Jon Gruden, head coach of the Tampa Bay Buccaneers, received the key to the city following the Buccaneers' Super Bowl XXXVII victory.

Georgia

Franklin Springs
2007: The Governor of Georgia, Sonny Perdue, received the key to the city of Franklin Springs after visiting the city and cutting the ribbon to the city's new Public Safety and City Hall buildings; the original buildings were destroyed in 2004 by Hurricane Ivan.

Milton
2007: The original Governor's Commission for the City of Milton (Ron Wallace, Brandon Beach, Gregory Mishkin, Dan Phalan and Cecil Pruitt) was awarded the key to the city of Milton in recognition of their work in the creation of the city. They were also presented a proclamation that officially declares December 1 as "Commissioning Day" in honor of their achievements and recognizes the five men as the "Founding Fathers" of the city.

Dawsonville
November 9, 2020: 2020 NASCAR Cup Series Champion Chase Elliott received the key to the city of Dawsonville, Georgia as a way to celebrate the 24 year old Dawsonville native's first championship at the highest level of motorsports.

Hawaii

Honolulu
 12 December 2014: Michelle Wie, American Golfer.

Illinois

Chicago
December 30, 1871: Grand Duke Alexei Alexandrovich of Russia received the "Freedom of the City of Chicago".
June 26, 1933: Residents of the Midget Village at the Century of Progress World's Fair were presented with a key to the City of Chicago by Mayor Edward Joseph Kelly.
August 17, 1970: As part of Chicago's Lakefront Festival, Mayor Richard J. Daley awarded a key to the City of Chicago to Edward Stein, who had emerged from the Chicago River dressed as Neptune to lead a parade.
May 1985: Jean McFadden, leader of the Glasgow District Council was presented a key to the City of Chicago by Joel Hall as part of Glasgow's Mayfest
April 21, 1988: Michael Jackson was awarded the Key to the city by Eugene Sawyer.
March 20, 1990: Audrey Hepburn was presented with a key to the City of Chicago by Mayor Richard M. Daley.
October 12, 1990: Sophia Loren was presented with a key to the City of Chicago by Mayor Richard M. Daley.
1996: The famous Lebanese Arab singer Najwa Karam was presented with the Key to the City of Chicago.

North Chicago
 July 11, 2011: Shawn Marion, basketball player with the Dallas Mavericks, was awarded the key to the city following the Mavericks' victory at the 2011 NBA Finals.

Springfield
 March 11, 2015: Mayor J. Michael Houston awarded the Key to the city to Cobra Commander from G.I. Joe in honor of the G.I. JoeCon convention taking place the following month.

Bensenville
  June 22, 2018:  Village President Frank DeSimone, Village Manager Evan K. Summers, and Chief of Police Frank Kosman, presented Keys to the Village to Cónsul General Billy Adolfo José Muñoz Miranda and Vice Cónsul Brenda Paz de Ghassemi from the Consulate General of Guatemala.

Indiana

Gary

 June 11, 2003: Artist Michael Jackson received keys to the city of Gary from Mayor Scott King.

Indianapolis
 July 17, 2015: Reggie Wayne, wide receiver for the Indianapolis Colts NFL football team receives a key to the city of Indianapolis

Salem

 November 11, 1999: Disability advocate Gary Gambino received the key to the city of Salem from Mayor Douglas Campbell.

South Bend 

 2012: Comedian Jerry Seinfeld received the key to the city from Mayor Pete Buttigieg.

Iowa

Des Moines
 21 October 2006: Bill Bryson, Author

Kansas

Lyons
 April 2022: Marshall Christmann, received the Key to the City for 20 plus years of philanthropic contributions to people of Lyons, Kansas, and for numerous negotiations between governmental agencies for those same citizens, Presented by Mayor Dustin Schultz.

Kentucky

Bowling Green
 August 26, 2004: Dionne Warwick, singer, received the key to the city prior to her appearance at an Athena Cage concert.

Louisville
1975: Helen Humes, musician, received the key to the city for her extensive musical career.
1990s: Frederick Cease, soldier, received the key to the city for his extensive military service.
 July, 2000: Nancy Johnson Barker, singer, received the key to the city after the 25th anniversary of the Kentucky Music Weekend Festival. 
2002: Ivor Chodkowski, farmer, received the key to the city for working to start a farmer's market in Louisville's "food desert."
 September 24, 2002: Montgomery Gentry, musicians, received the key to the city for their musical career.
January 2010: Sam Leist, lawyer, received the key to the city for his career in public service.
 March 12, 2016: Bryson Tiller, singer, received the key to the city by the city's mayor, Greg Fischer, as well as a holiday on March 12, called "Bryson Tiller Day." This all occurred at his T R A P S O U L concert.
 April 5, 2016: Awadeya Mahmoud, human rights worker, received the key to the city by Greg Fischer, upon her receiving the International Women of Courage Award.
 June 29, 2016: John Rabun, social worker, received the key to the city by Greg Fischer, for his work as the head of the National Center for Missing and Exploited Children.
 January 10, 2017: Bob Beatty, American football Coach, received the key to the city by Greg Fischer, after winning Trinity High School's 24th state football title.

Williamsburg
 January 16, 2019: Nick Wilson, public defender, was awarded the key to the city after winning Survivor: David vs. Goliath.

Louisiana

New Orleans
November 21, 2006: Kentucky-New Orleans Architecture Studio was awarded the key to the city of New Orleans for its work on restoration and re-design efforts of Mickey Markey Park in Bywater.
April 26, 2007: The Harris County Hospital District was awarded the key to the city in recognition of its efforts to provide health care to Hurricane Katrina evacuees at its Astrodome Clinic in September 2005.
June 2008: Atlanta native, R&B Singer Usher awarded the key to the city for his effort and dedication to help rebuild New Orleans after Hurricane Katrina.
September 25, 2011: Former New Orleans Saints safety Steve Gleason was granted the key to the city for his blocked punt against the Atlanta Falcons in the Saints' first home game after Hurricane Katrina.
September 17, 2018: August 21, 2018: Beyoncé and Jay-Z received the key to the city for their philanthropy work and impact on popular culture.
May 20, 2019: Jesseca Dupart was awarded the key to the city to recognize the philanthropy and business she had contributed to in the area.

Maine

Portland
 March, 2003: Dr Gerry McKenna, President of the University of Ulster, in recognition of promoting research and economic linkages between Northern Ireland and Maine
July 13, 2008: moe., a band from upstate New York, was presented the key to the city in recognition of a two-day fundraising concert they organised for the Preble Street Resource Center.
 June 13, 2014: Evander Holyfield, American Boxer

Maryland

Baltimore
September 10, 2012: Keys to the city were awarded to eight athletes who competed in the 2012 Summer Olympics: swimmers Michael Phelps(Key revoked 2014) and Katie Ledecky, rower David Banks, windsurfer Farrah Hall, cyclist Bobby Lea, field hockey player Katie O'Donnell, kayaker Scott Parsons, and modern pentathlete Suzanne Stettinius.

Massachusetts

Brockton
 September 29, 1980: Boxer Marvin Hagler was crowned World Middleweight Champion of September 27, and received the key to the city on his return to his hometown.

Holyoke
 July 21, 1909: Mayor Nathan P. Avery awarded Joseph Lewis Wyckoff the Key to the city, "through whose militant energy the boundaries of their city were so extended by the Legislature of 1909 as to include within them not only himself but the whole of the ancient hamlet known as Smith's Ferry."
 April 27, 2018: Mayor Alex B. Morse presented Carmen Yulín Cruz the Key to the city to honor that "in such a time of despair [she] provided a beacon of hope and opportunity for Puerto Ricans".

Worcester
 July 8, 2017: Mayor of Worcester Joseph Petty presented Shatta Wale with the key to the city, in recognition of his contributions to the arts and for honoring the city of Worcester, Massachusetts with his presence."

Michigan

Albion
1960s: Ann Landers received the key to the city of Albion upon her visit to Starr Commonwealth for Boys.

Detroit

September 26, 1974: Stevie Wonder, renowned Motown recording artist was awarded a key to the city by then Mayor Coleman Young.
August 1975: Horace Jackson, filmmaker, was honored with a key to the city for his film Deliver Us From Evil with Detroit City Council member Emma Henderson stating "Mr. Jackson has produced a film the entire family can enjoy" and recognized him one of the pioneers of Black films in the sixties and seventies.
1980: Saddam Hussein, Iraqi President at that time, was awarded the key to the city by Mayor Coleman Young, for having donated hundreds of thousands of dollars to a local church.
January 31, 2006: Detroit native Jerome Bettis was awarded the key to the city by Mayor Kwame Kilpatrick days before his Super Bowl win. 
January 2, 2007: Steve Yzerman received the key to the city after his retirement and having his jersey retired.
January 27, 2010: Elmo received the key to the city from Mayor David Bing during a visit with kids at Children's Hospital of Michigan.
April 1, 2017: Big Sean received the key to the city from Mayor Mike Duggan for setting up a foundation called "Mogul Prep" that teaches kids all the behind the scenes jobs available in the music industry.
June 15, 2018: Jackson 5 members, Jackie, Tito, Jermaine, Marlon & Michael were honored with keys to the city at the  Detroit Music Weekend festival.
February 29, 2020: Members of the Detroit Youth Choir received keys to the city.
 February 26, 2023: DJ Leo Alton received a key to the city for his charitable work with the Detroit Community.

Flint

1989: Lois M. Craig received the key to the city of Flint.
June 10, 2007: American Idol finalist LaKisha Jones received a proclamation and key to the city from Mayor Don Williamson.

Kalamazoo
 
December 17, 2018: Kalamazoo native Julian Ravi Cosmin Borst received the key to the city of Kalamazoo from former Mayor Bobby J Hopewell, for the three gold medals he won in the national games of the Special Olympics.

 November 11, 2019 Longtime members of the Kalamazoo City Commission, Bobby Hopewell and Don Cooney, had their final meeting as members of the commission Monday night and received keys to the city during proclamations to honor them by new Mayor David Anderson

Sault Sainte Marie
July 22, 2007 Kiss (band) received the key to the city of Sault Ste Marie.

Traverse City 

 2005: Traverse City native Carter Oosterhouse received a key to the city from Mayor Linda Smyka.

Missouri 
Jefferson City
July 16, 2022: Rock band Buckcherry was awarded the Key to the City by Mayor Carrie Tergin.

Nevada

Fernley
 August 2012: Jacob Dalton, American Olympic Gymnast (2012).

Las Vegas
1999: Lebanese recording artist Fairuz  received the key to the city of Las Vegas
October 25, 2003: Artist Michael Jackson received keys to the city of Las Vegas from Mayor Oscar Goodman.
2012: Canadian, business person, Elise Diker received the key to the city of Las Vegas gifted by her husband & international philanthropist, Mark Diker and Mayor Oscar Goodman in honor of her passion and love for the city. 
2012: Lebanese recording artist Nancy Ajram received the key to the city of Las Vegas.
2012: Legendary Reggae Group Black Uhuru (Ducky Simpson) was honored with the key to the city of Las Vegas and August 31 was officially declared Black Uhuru Day in Las Vegas.
2014: On November 5, American singer Britney Spears was honored, and received the key to the city of Las Vegas.
2015: professional baseball players Bryce Harper and Kris Bryant received keys to the city of Las Vegas
2016: Professional DJ, record producer, radio personality, and record label executive DJ Khaled received keys to the city of Las Vegas
2016: Property Brothers, Jonathan and Drew Scott earn receive keys to the city of Las Vegas after their contributions towards charity
2017: On September 3, Ultralight Team members and creators of Bats & Butterflies LV, Anthony C. Flores and Isaiah J. LaBelle received keys to the city of Las Vegas
2018: On July 6, UFC president Dana White received keys to the city of Las Vegas
April 30, 2019: Panic! at the Disco vocalist Brendon Urie received the key to the city of Las Vegas for his accomplishments in music.
May 2, 2019: James Holzhauer was awarded a key to the Las Vegas Strip for his success on Jeopardy! and donations to children's charity organizations and other nonprofit organizations in the Las Vegas area.
April 16, 2022: Viva Las Vegas Rockabilly Weekend promoter Tom Ingram was presented with a ceremonial key to Las Vegas at The Orleans Hotel & Casino
April 22, 2022: RuPaul received the keys to the city for his unprecedented career in showbusiness and for making RuPaul’s Drag Race Live! one of the hottest shows on the Las Vegas Strip. The day was also proclaimed RuPaul Day.
June 8, 2022: Katy Perry was awarded the keys for Las Vegas Strip in the honor of her residency “PLAY”.

New Jersey

Atlantic City
June 21, 2013: Mallory Hagan, winner of Miss America 2013

Camden County
2000: Britney Spears

Hoboken
 October 30, 1947: Frank Sinatra, American Singer and Actor.
 July 6, 1998: Aaron Rosa, drummer of the rock band Palisades.

Jersey City 
 March 17, 1961: Brendan Behan, Irish playwright and author, received the keys to Jersey City from Mayor Charles Witkowski.

Newark 
2016: Professor Don Jacob, Martial Artist, Grandmaster

Paterson
 April 15, 2012: Victor Cruz (American football) of the New York Giants was awarded the key to the city of Paterson for his role in the Super Bowl XLVI victory over the New England Patriots.
August 28, 2015: Rapper Fetty Wap was given the key to the city of his hometown Paterson, New Jersey by Mayor Jose "Joey" Torres.
June 1, 2018: US Senator Cory Booker was given the key to the city of Paterson by Mayor Jane Williams-Warren for his service to the state of New Jersey.
 May 25, 2022: Mayor Andre Sayegh presented Felisa Van Liew, Principal of Public School No. 2, with Paterson's Key to the City

New York

Buffalo
November 6, 1981: To symbolize the city’s appreciation for Triumph’s music and loyalty to Buffalo, Mayor James D. Griffin presented the Key and certificate of commemoration to members Rik Emmett and Gil Moore. In exchange, the band gifted Mayor Griffin with an official Allied Forces tour jacket.
May 19, 2009: Terrell Owens received the key to the city of Buffalo with the provisions that he catch a minimum of 10 touchdown passes for the Buffalo Bills and lead the team into the NFL Playoffs. He caught 5 touchdowns and the Bills did not make the playoffs.
November 6, 2014: Terry Pegula received the key to the city of Buffalo, as a result of his purchase of the Buffalo Sabres, Buffalo Bills and Buffalo Bandits professional sports teams and his construction of the HarborCenter complex.

Mount Vernon

New York
June 27, 1702: Viscount Cornbury was presented the "Freedom of the City".
September 1735: Andrew Hamilton received the "Freedom of the City" for his defence of John Peter Zenger.
February 25, 1902: Prince Henry of Prussia was presented the Freedom of the City during a visit to New York.
1927: The aviator Charles Lindbergh was awarded the key to the city following his record-breaking non-stop flight from New York to Paris.

1969: Irish Civil Rights Activist Bernadette Devlin received honorary keys to the city in 1969 from Mayor Lindsay whilst on tour in America to raise money for the civil rights movement in Northern Ireland. As the tour came to a close Devlin became disenfranchised with Irish Americans who struggled to see the parallel of the civil rights movement in the U.S. with that in Ireland. The following year she gave the key to friend and fellow activist Eamon McCann who presented it to Robert Bay of the Black Panthers on her behalf as a show of solidarity.
1972: Musical group The Jackson 5 received keys to the city of New York from Deputy Mayor Edward Hamilton.
 June 10, 1991: Richard Cheney, Colin Powell, Norman Schwarzkopf after a ticker-tape parade up the Canyon of Heroes in lower Manhattan as part of Welcome Home celebration for Desert Storm forces.
February 5, 2008: The New York Giants players, coaches and owners received keys to the city in recognition of their victory at Super Bowl XLII. Presentation took place at City Hall after a ticker-tape parade up the Canyon of Heroes in lower Manhattan.
February 9, 2009: Chesley B. Sullenberger III received the key to the city for safely landing US Airways Flight 1549 in the Hudson River after mid-air faults from a bird collision, saving the lives of all 155 people on board. The First Officer of the Flight, Jeffrey B. Skiles, and flight attendants Sheila Dail, Doreen Welsh and Donna Dent also received keys to the city.
May 8, 2009: Captain Richard Phillips and crewman William Rios received keys to the city in recognition of their heroism aboard the Maersk Alabama during the 2009 hijacking by Somali pirates.
November 6, 2009: The New York Yankees players, coaches and owners received keys to the city in recognition of their 2009 World Series victory.
October 14, 2010: Ralph Lauren received a key for his philanthropic and economic contributions to the city. 
November 18, 2011: Regis Philbin received a key to the city to honor his twenty-eight year contribution to New York media.
February 7, 2012: The New York Giants players, coaches and owners received keys to the city in recognition of their victory at Super Bowl XLVI. Presentation took place at City Hall after a ticker-tape parade up the Canyon of Heroes in lower Manhattan.
July 10, 2015: The United States Women's National Soccer Team players and coaches received keys to the city in recognition of their 2015 Women's World Cup victory. The parade was organized on short notice and was the first ticker-tape parade in New York City to honor female athletes since Olympic Athletes in 1984.
January 9, 2016: Ray Pfeifer FDNY Firefighter receives the Key to the City of New York for his work to help secure health care for over 80,000 9/11/01 first responders. The James Zadroga 9/11 Health and Compensation Act was signed into law on December 18, 2015
March 2, 2016: Rapper Foxy Brown was honored by Mayor Bill de Blasio and awarded the Key to the city.
June 11, 2017: Rapper Fabolous and the late artist Jean-Michel Basquiat were awarded keys to the city by Brooklyn Borough President Eric Adams at the Brooklyn Botanic Garden.
June 26, 2017: Rapper Nicki Minaj was honored by the Queens Borough President Melinda Katz and awarded the Key to the city for her outstanding career achievements in music.
August 8, 2022: LL Cool J was awarded the Key to the city during the Rock the Bells festival in Queens.

Rochester
 June 25, 1968: Borussia Dortmund, a German professional association football team.
 June 17, 1973: Pelé, Brazilian professional footballer 
 June 3, 2013: The Rochester Knighthawks, a professional lacrosse team
April 23, 2016: Beverly Bond,  producer, writer, serial entrepreneur, philanthropist and celebrity DJ, received a key to the city for her contribution to the African American community by empowering and positively impacting the lives of young Black girls through her organization-Black Girls Rock!
March 19, 2019: John P. Schreiber received the Key to the City of Rochester, N.Y. for his 30 years of dedicated service to the city, culminating as Fire Chief or "Car 1". Under his watch, Rochester became an ISO Class 1 city for fire protection, making the Rochester Fire Department one of the best in the country.

Binghamton
August 12, 2007: Dusan Vemic, a professional tennis player on the ATP world tour was given a key to the city in recognition of his fair play and contribution to the sport.
November 22, 2021: John Hughes, Jr, owner of the Binghamton Rumble Ponies was given a key to the city in recognition of stopping the Minor League Baseball team from relocating in 2015 and working with Major League Baseball, the New York Mets and elected officials from the State of New York assuring affiliated Minor League Baseball in Binghamton, NY for decades to come.

North Carolina

Charlotte

 Stephen Curry, professional basketball player for the Golden State Warriors of the National Basketball Association (NBA) and fellow Charlottean received the Key to the City from Mayor Vi Lyles in 2022.

High Point
 Billy Quick, a High Point native and a Special Olympics athlete and ambassador.
 October 13, 2017: Kathy Ireland, American model and actress, turned author and entrepreneur; received the key from High Point mayor Bill Bencini.

Huntersville 

 March 15, 2021: Two teenagers, Owen and Walker, were awarded keys to the city for alerting authorities to the 2020 Colonial Pipeline oil spill.

Wilmington 

 June 20, 2013: Stephen King, author, was awarded the Key to the City at an advance screening of the CBS series Under the Dome, based on a novel by King.

Ohio

Akron
 May 28, 2016: Mark Mothersbaugh, artist and Devo founder, was awarded the key to the city during a ceremony at the Akron-Summit County Public Library.

Columbus
 May 26, 2005: Fatty Koo, singers songwriter Music group

Toledo
 1962: Glass Key to the City of Toledo, Don Constantino de la Cruz-Sanchez, President of the Chamber of Commerce of Toledo (Spain, Europe).
 May 13, 2010: Crystal Bowersox, singer-songwriter and actress, was given the key to the city after reaching the finals of American Idol.
 August 28, 2022: Larry Fuller, jazz pianist from Toledo, Ohio, was given the glass key to the city “For Excellence in Jazz Music and Headlining the Inaugural Glass City Jazz Festival”.

Cincinnati
 1974: Pramukh Swami Maharaj, President and Spiritual head of BAPS
 2015: Cate Blanchett, Australian Actress.
 2015: Rooney Mara, American Actress.
 2015: Christine Vachon, American Film Producer.
 2015: Sir Elton John CBE, British Singer. 
 2015: Lionel Richie, American Singer.
 2015: Jennifer Hudson, American Actress and Singer.
 2015: Carl Hilding Severinsen, American Musician and Bandleader on The Tonight Show Starring Johnny Carson.
 2015: Drew Lachey, American Singer. 
 2015: Nick Lachey, American Singer.
 2016: Okyeame Kwame, Ghanaian Musician.
 2018: Jack White, American Musician.
 2019: Rose Lavelle, American Soccer Player.

Cleveland
 1968: B.B. King, American blues singer, guitarist, songwriter, and record producer 
 1969: Carl B. Stokes, American Politician, Civil Rights Leader, First African American Mayor of a Major U.S.City
 Pelé, Brazilian soccer player.
 1974: Pramukh Swami Maharaj, President and Spiritual head of BAPS
June 16, 2011: Valerie Bertinelli, Jane Leeves, Wendie Malick, and Betty White, the stars of the television series Hot in Cleveland.
 November 5, 2011: Aretha Franklin, American singer.
 July 17, 2015: Mickey Bey, IBF lightweight boxing champion.

Warren 

 August 2, 2009: Dave Grohl, American Musician.

Oklahoma

Oklahoma City 

 June 13, 2022: Russell Westbrook, American basketball player, received a key to the city from Mayor David Holt.
 May 14, 2019: Kristin Chenoweth, American actress and singer.

Tulsa
 March 18, 2010: Robert Meachem, NFL Football Player.
 June 27, 2017: Iesha-LaShay Phillips received a key to the city of Tulsa, OK for addressing societal issues and trying to better her city. Mayor Bynum also declared June 27 "Iesha Phillips Day" in Tulsa, Oklahoma.
 October 8, 2022: Employees of Saint Francis Health System collectively received a single key to the city for their services to the community.

Pennsylvania

Pittsburgh 

 September 20, 2013: mayor Luke Ravenstahl presented the Key to the City of Pittsburgh to rapper Mac Miller and received official city proclamation declaring September 20 Mac Miller Day.

Rhode Island

Central Falls
 June 7, 2014: Central Falls mayor James Diossa presented the Key to the City to actor Alec Baldwin in recognition of his financial support of the city's public library.

Pawtucket
 January 15, 2016: Rep. Carlos E. Tobon and Mayor Don Grebien presented recording artist Jon B. with a state citation and a key to the City of Pawtucket

Providence
 December 9, 1921: Italian commander Armando Diaz was presented with a "solid gold" Key to the City by mayor Joseph H. Gainer.
 (ca. 1980s): Mayor Joseph R. Paolino Jr. presented the Key to the City to Joe Mangone
 1992: Mayor Buddy Cianci presented the Key to the City to telephone operator Rose P. Brock, for her work updating the City Hall computer systems.
 June 20, 2005: Mayor David Cicilline presented the Key to the City to Mark J. Lerman, Artistic Director of Providence's Perishable Theatre
 April 21, 2021: Mayor Jorge Elorza presented the Key to the City to NCAA official Michael Stephens "following his illustrious selection as an official in the NCAA Men’s Basketball Division I championship game"
 May 17, 2022: Mayor Jorge Elorza presented the Key to the City to Providence College Men’s Basketball Head Coach Ed Cooley
 November 30, 2022: Mayor Elorza presented World Series MVP Jeremy Peña with the Key to the City

Woonsocket
 May 12, 2017: Mayor Lisa Baldelli-Hunt presented MMA athlete Andre Soukhamthath with the Key to the City of Woonsocket.

South Carolina

Columbia

 November 9, 1973: Muhammad Ali then NABF Heavyweight Champion received the key to the City of Columbia from then Mayor John T Campbell in Ali's next two bouts he would go on to beat Joe Frazier & George Foreman.
 August 21, 2018: Beyoncé and Jay-Z received the key to the city of Columbia, SC for their philanthropy work and impact on popular culture. Mayor Steve Benjamin also declared August 21 "Beyoncé Knowles-Carter and Sean Carter Day" in the city.
 February 5, 2019: Angell Conwell, television actress and native of nearby Orangeburg.

Tennessee

Dayton
 July 21, 1960: John T. Scopes was given the key to the city on the 35th anniversary of the Scopes Trial, in which he had been found guilty of teaching evolution in a Tennessee school.

Elizabethton
June 21, 2013: Jason Witten, American football player

Knoxville
September 17, 2021: Bianca Blair was handed the key to the city by Mayor Glenn Thomas Jacobs during her homecoming ceremony on WWE Smackdown.

Memphis
February 15, 2011: Grandmaster Hikaru Nakamura received the key to the city of Memphis for his supertournament victory at the 2011 Tata Steel Chess Tournament in Wijk aan Zee.

Nashville
 John Glenn, American Astronaut and United States Senator.
1967: Daniel Sharpe Malekebu, Malawian doctor, missionary, and anti-colonial activist.

1991: Jean Stafford, Australian country music artist.

Texas

Austin
May 3, 1901: President William McKinley received the key to Austin, Texas from Mayor R.F White.
April 11, 2008: His Highness the Aga Khan, Imam (spiritual leader) of the Ismaili Muslims and founder of the Aga Khan Development Network (AKDN) was presented with the Key to the City of Austin by Mayor Will Wynn of Austin upon his arrival in the city.
October 11, 2022 Meme Styles, Data Activist and President of MEASURE was presented the Key To The City of Austin by Mayor Steve Adler.

Beaumont 

 November 17, 2005: Johnny and Edgar Winter were inducted to the Southeast Texas Walk of fame at Ford Park in their hometown of Beaumont, Texas for their contribution to music and career accomplishments. They were awarded the key to the city by the Mayor and County Judge. 
 June 4, 2015: Mayor Becky Ames awarded Beaumont native Layla Nejad the key to the city - alongside her Texas 4000 for Cancer team after cycling to City Hall during a stop on the 70-day charity cycling trip from Austin, Tx to Anchorage, AK - for her role in helping expand the route to stop in Southeast Texas to raise money and awareness for cancer research.

Denison
1952: Presidential candidate General Dwight D. Eisenhower received the key to his birthplace city from Mayor Alfred Cecil "Mike" Casey.

El Paso
February 10, 2012: Gabriel Iglesias was presented with several awards by the city of El Paso, Texas, including the key to the city and the Beacon of H.O.P.E Award from the nonprofit organization Operation H.O.P.E.
September 13, 2018: Recording R&B artist and El Pasoan Khalid earned the key to El Paso, Texas from Mayor Donald "Dee" Margo.

Missouri City, TX 
March 2, 2015 Johnnie Moutra III (Johnny Long), nationally known for co-hosting Jimmy Kimmel Live at his home & winning the grand prize on ABC's hit reality TV show "Here Come The Newlyweds," was awarded key to the city by Mayor Allen Owen for the national recognition he continues to bring to the city.
February 10, 2018: Missouri City native rapper Travis Scott was awarded the key by Mayor Allen Owen as a part of the city's annual Black History Month Celebration of Culture and Music.

Dallas
December 13, 2009: M. K. Asante was awarded the key to the city of Dallas for his work as an author, filmmaker, and professor.
February 6, 2011: Michael Vick, quarterback for the Philadelphia Eagles, was awarded the key to the city of Dallas by Mayor Pro Tem Dwaine Caraway; this proved controversial, as Vick had previously served time in prison for his involvement with an illegal dog-fighting ring.
November 21, 2018: Dirk Nowitzki, basketball player for the Dallas Mavericks, was awarded the key to the city of Dallas by Mayor Mike Rawlings for his professional achievements in his 20 seasons with the organization, as well as his humanitarian contributions.

Irving
 July 19, 2013: Mike and Bob Bryan, twin brothers and professional tennis players
 August 20, 2017: Mahant Swami Maharaj, Hindu swami and 6th Spiritual leader of BAPS.

Mansfield
June 6, 2013: Tony Kanaan, race car driver

North Richland Hills
February 11, 2023: Gabriel Cespedes, detective

Sugar Land
March 18, 2018: His Highness the Aga Khan, Imam (spiritual leader) of the Ismaili Muslims and founder of the Aga Khan Development Network (AKDN), was presented with a Key to the City of Sugar Land by Mayor Zimmerman in recognition of his 60 years of commitment to improving the quality of life for some of the world's most vulnerable populations.

Utah

West Valley City
July 27, 2011: Halaevalu Mata'aho 'Ahome'e, HM The Queen Mother of Tonga

Ogden
June 15, 2013: Damian Lillard, basketball player

Kaysville City 
 May 31, 2017: Lincoln and Dan Markham, YouTube stars

City of Moab 
 September 17, 2022: Kevin Costner was given the key to the city by Mayor Joette Langianese

Virginia

Roanoke
 May 4, 2016: George Takei was given the Key to the city by Mayor David A. Bowers

Washington

Seattle
 1968: Seattle officials planned to give musician Jimi Hendrix the keys to the city, but canceled the event.
 In 1984, Seattle mayor Charles Royer stated that the city does not award keys, but instead gifted comedian Bob Hope a quiche with the design of the Space Needle.

Bremerton
 September 2006: MxPx was given the keys to the city of Bremerton by Mayor Cary Bozeman.

Kent
 August 2020: YouTuber Justin "nothinbutlag" was given the keys to the city of Kent by Mayor Dana Ralph for helping the city increase their social media following.

Spokane
 June 9, 1948: Harry S. Truman, 33rd President of the United States, stopped at Spokane while campaigning for re-election, and was given the key to the city.
 1980: Ted Nugent, Rock musician, stopped in Spokane during a concert tour, and was given the key to the city by then-mayor Ron Bair.

Olympia

 On April 4, 2019, Royal Mitchell was awarded the key to the city for saving lives on the streets of Olympia in the middle of the night, in the rain. He also ensured safety of the homeless by leading a team of people who did night patrols in 2015 and 2016.

Wisconsin

Green Bay
 January 4, 2004: Arizona Cardinals receiver Nate Poole was presented the key to the city from Mayor Jim Schmitt for catching a late touchdown pass against the Green Bay Packers' hated rival, the Minnesota Vikings, in the final game of the regular season, which allowed the Packers to make the playoffs that season. After the presentation, Poole was invited to attend the Packers' playoff game against the Seattle Seahawks.
 August 10, 2016: Rock band Kiss played at the Resch Center on the Freedom to Rock Tour. During the encore, they were presented the key to the city by Mayor Jim Schmitt.

Wausau
 July 2007: Musician "Weird Al" Yankovic received the key to the city after a concert performance at the Wisconsin Valley Fair.

References

Keys
+
Keys to the City